Amsberg is the name of a German noble family which originated from Mecklenburg. A great-grandson of a blacksmith, parish pastor August Amsberg (1747–1820) started calling himself "von Amsberg" in 1795 and the family's right to use this name was confirmed by the Frederick Francis III, Grand Duke of Mecklenburg-Schwerin in 1891. By this permission to use a noble privilege, the family effectively became part of the untitled lower nobility of the Grand Duchy of Mecklenburg-Schwerin. The present King of the Netherlands, Willem-Alexander, is an agnatic member of this family.

Members of the family live in the Netherlands and in Northern Germany. Its most notable member is the family's current head (i.e. senior male line descendant), King Willem-Alexander of the Netherlands. King Willem-Alexander, his brothers and his brothers’ children hold the title "Jonkheer (or female Jonkvrouw) van Amsberg," and have the surname "van Oranje-Nassau van Amsberg."

History
The line traces back to one Jürgen Amtsberg (d. 1686), master blacksmith in the village of Schwichtenberg near Borrentin, then part of Swedish Pomerania. His great–grandson Johann David Theodor August Amsberg (1747–1820), Protestant pastor at the parish church of Kavelstorf near Rostock in the Duchy of Mecklenburg-Schwerin, from about 1795 styled himself von Amsberg without objection. The Amsbergs had been commoners at first, and the preposition probably was used to signify the family from the name of their ancestors, rather than from the name of a place they originated from. A notable member was his son Philipp August von Amsberg (1788–1871), who initiated the establishment of the Duchy of Brunswick State Railway inaugurated in 1838. The family received the official approval to hold the noble title by decree of the Grand Duchy of Mecklenburg-Schwerin in 1891.

On 10 March 1966 Claus von Amsberg married the heir presumptive to the Dutch throne, Princess Beatrix of Orange-Nassau, Princess of Lippe-Biesterfeld, and from 1980 until his death in 2002 was prince consort of the Queen of the Netherlands. He is the father of Willem-Alexander, King of the Netherlands and Jonkheer van Amsberg. Willem-Alexander's younger brother Prince Friso van Oranje-Nassau van Amsberg, due to his marriage with Mabel Martine Wisse Smit, lost his status as a Prince of the Netherlands but retained for himself royal status as prince of Orange-Nassau and for his children received the title of  count/countess of Orange-Nassau. The marriage of the third-born son Prince Constantijn so far has produced the only male heir of the main Amsberg line, Claus-Casimir van Oranje-Nassau van Amsberg born in 2004. In 2001 it was established by Decree that children born in the marriage of Prince Constantijn will hold the hereditary noble title and honorific Count (Countess) van Oranje-Nassau, Jonkheer (Jonkvrouw) van Amsberg and have the surname Van Oranje-Nassau van Amsberg. In 2004 the same regulation was established for Prince Friso and the children born in his marriage. When Willem-Alexander became king in 2013 the House of Amsberg did not become the ruling House of the Netherlands however and stayed as the house of his mother as is tradition in the Netherlands  . 

Several members of the family, mainly descendants of Philipp August von Amsberg and of Prince Claus' great–uncle Joachim von Amsberg (1869–1945), still live in Northern Germany.

The Dutch branch of the family, i.e. Prince Claus, the former Claus von Amsberg, has some distant Dutch/Flemish ancestors who left the Low Countries during Spanish rule, such as the Berenberg family and other prominent families of Antwerp.

Other notable family members include colonel Joachim von Amsberg, general Joachim von Amsberg and banker Joachim von Amsberg.

Heads of the family
This is a list of the heads, i.e. the senior male line members, of the Amsberg family, as well the patrilineal line of the current Dutch royal family. Before the 1891 ennoblement, being the senior male descendant did not have any legal relevance, and such the term "head" is anachronistic before the family's rise as a noble and eventually royal family. The headship of the family since its recognition as noble in 1891 has some historical legal relevance prior to the formal abolition of the nobility's privileges in 1918.

Jürgen Amtsberg, ca. 1640–1686, master blacksmith
Jürgen Amtsberg, 1680–1756, master baker
Georg Amtsberg, 1717–1772
Johann David Theodor August Amsberg, who started calling himself "von Amsberg" from 1795, 1747–1820, pastor in Kavelstorf
Joachim Karl Theodor von Amsberg, 1777–1842
Gabriel Ludwig Johann von Amsberg, 1822–1899, received permission from the Grand Duke to use the particle "von" in 1891, effectively an ennoblement
Wilhelm von Amsberg, 1856–1929
Claus Felix von Amsberg, 1890–1953
Prince Claus of the Netherlands, Jonkheer van Amsberg, né Klaus von Amsberg, 1926–2002, a former diplomat of Germany
King Willem-Alexander of the Netherlands, Jonkheer van Amsberg, b. 1967.

Line of succession to the headship of the Amsberg family
Since German aristocracy practice agnatic primogeniture, the heir presumptive to the headship, and the ones next in line, are
Prince Constantijn of the Netherlands, Jonkheer van Amsberg, the King of The Netherlands' younger brother
Count Claus-Casimir of Orange-Nassau, Jonkheer van Amsberg, Constantijn's son
Dirk von Amsberg (b. 1961), a grandson of General Joachim von Amsberg
Paul von Amsberg (b. 2002), Dirk's son

Literature 
 Genealogisches Handbuch des Adels, Adelslexikon Band I, Band 53 der Gesamtreihe, C. A. Starke Verlag, Limburg (Lahn) 1972, 
 Die Ahnen Claus Georg von Amsberg (Euler) - Nassau und die Niederlande (Heck), Starke Verlag 1966, Sonderdruck aus Archiv für Sippenforschung Heft 21

 
German noble families
Mecklenburgian nobility
Lower Saxon nobility